Hendrik "Henri" Verbrugghe (20 July 1929 – 9 July 2009) was a Belgian sprint canoeist who competed from the early 1950s to the mid-1960s. He won a gold medal in the K-2 1000 m event at the 1958 ICF Canoe Sprint World Championships in Prague.

Verbrugghe also competed in four Summer Olympics, earning his best finish of sixth in the K-2 1000 m event at Melbourne in 1956.

References

 
 
  

1929 births
2009 deaths
Belgian male canoeists
Canoeists at the 1952 Summer Olympics
Canoeists at the 1956 Summer Olympics
Canoeists at the 1960 Summer Olympics
Canoeists at the 1964 Summer Olympics
Olympic canoeists of Belgium
ICF Canoe Sprint World Championships medalists in kayak